Hawley's of High Street is a 1933 British comedy film directed by Thomas Bentley and starring Leslie Fuller, Judy Kelly, Francis Lister and Moore Marriott. Its plot concerns a butcher and a draper who stand for election to the local council.

Cast
 Leslie Fuller as Bill Hawley
 Judy Kelly as Millie Hawley
 Francis Lister as Lord Roxton
 Amy Veness as Mrs Hawley
 Moore Marriott as Mr Busworth
 Hal Gordon as Nichols
 Wylie Watson as Reverend Potter
 Faith Bennett as Edith Busworth
 Elizabeth Vaughan as Lady Evelyn
 Jimmy Godden as Mayor

References

External links

1933 films
1933 comedy films
British comedy films
Films shot at British International Pictures Studios
1930s English-language films
Films directed by Thomas Bentley
British black-and-white films
1930s British films